In Trousers is a musical, which premiered Off-Broadway in 1979, with book, music and lyrics by William Finn. It is the first in a trilogy of musicals, followed by March of the Falsettos and then Falsettoland.

Concept
The one-act musical centers on Marvin, who has a wife and children. He recalls the past relationships he shared with, among others, his high school sweetheart and Miss Goldberg, his English teacher who let him play Christopher Columbus in the school play, and then reveals he prefers to be with men. Torn between his natural inclination and his desire not to upset his family life as he knows it, Marvin ultimately makes the decision he feels is best for him.

Productions
In Trousers, directed by Finn, was developed off-off-Broadway in 1978 and mounted twice in 1979 at Off-Broadway's Playwrights Horizons, opening on February 21 for 24 performances and again on December 8 for 8. The cast -- Chip Zien, Alison Fraser, Joanna Green, and Mary Testa—was the same for both productions. The play was next produced Off-Broadway at the Second Stage Theatre in March 1981, with Jay O. Sanders as Marvin, Kate Dezina (Wife), Alaina Reed (His Teacher, Miss Goldberg) and Karen Jablons (His High School Sweetheart). Direction was by Judith Swift with choreography by Marta Renzi and Sharon Kinney. The play was sharply panned.

In 1985, a significantly rewritten version, with additional songs, a more cohesive storyline, and better defined characters (with Marvin's wife christened Trina), opened on March 26 at the Off-Broadway Promenade Theatre, where it ran for 16 performances. Directed by Matt Casella, it starred Tony Cummings, Catherine Cox, Sherry Hursey, and Kathy Garrick. (Cummings was replaced by Stephen Bogardus shortly after the show opened.) In an author's note (dated April 1986) to this version, Finn wrote: "...a lot of the material was about my learning to write the kind of show songs I want to write. So the show is about Marvin's education, and mine." In his review of this production, Frank Rich wrote: "As lovingly orchestrated by Mr. Finn's long-time collaborator Michael Starobin, the melodies linger well after the final curtain; so do running lyrical conceits built around phrases like breaking down and giddy seizures. Isn't it typical of this luckless season that the musical with the best score would be more enjoyably heard on a cast album than seen on stage?"

After In Trousers was "viciously panned", Finn considered abandoning musical theater and attending medical school. Finn also lost his singing voice permanently during a shower scene in the show. He recalled that "There were problems, but it was fun". Finn felt that the negative reception to In Trousers was undeserved: "if the critic for the Times at that time had been more responsible, it would have been a considerable debut. But as it was, he just said it was junk. So I just started writing 'March of the Falsettos'."

Finn eventually collaborated with James Lapine on two additional one-acters, March of the Falsettos and Falsettoland, which further explored the lives of Marvin and his family and friends. These two later were combined for a two-act Broadway production entitled Falsettos.

Cast, Original, 1979
Marvin - Chip Zien
Trina - Alison Fraser
His Sweetheart - Joanna Green
Miss Goldberg - Mary Testa

Song list

1979
Very Opening - Marvin and Company
Marvin's Giddy Seizures – Marvin and Company
How the Body Falls Apart – His Wife, His Sweetheart, and Miss Goldberg
Your Lips and Me – His Wife
My High School Sweetheart – Company
Set Those Sails – Miss Goldberg and Company
My Chance to Survive the Night – Marvin
I Am Wearing a Hat – Miss Goldberg and Company
How Marvin Eats His Breakfast – Marvin and Company
A Breakfast Over Sugar – Marvin and His Wife
Whizzer Going Down – Marvin and Company
High School Ladies at Five O'Clock – Company
The Rape of Miss Goldberg – Marvin, Miss Goldberg, and His Sweetheart
The Nausea Before the Game – Marvin and Company
Love Me for What I Am – His Wife and Company
How America Got Its Name – Marvin
Your Lips and Me (Reprise) – His Wife and Company
Marvin Takes a Victory Shower – Company
Another Sleepless Night – Company
In Trousers (The Dream) – Marvin and Company

1985
In Trousers
I Can't Sleep
A Helluva Day
I Have a Family
How Marvin Eats His Breakfast
Marvin's Giddy Seizures
My High School Sweetheart
Set Those Sails
I Swear I Won't Ever Again (Part 1)
High School Ladies at Five O'Clock
I Swear I Won't Ever Again (Part 2)
The Rape of Miss Goldberg
I Swear I Won't Ever Again (Part 3)
Love Me for What I Am
I Am Wearing a Hat
Wedding Song
3 Seconds
Wedding Song (Part 2)
How the Body Falls Apart
I Feel Him Slipping Away
Whizzer Going Down
Marvin's Giddy Seizures (Part 2)
I'm Breaking Down
Packin' Up
Breakfast Over Sugar
How America Got Its Name
Another Sleepless Night
Good Night (No Hard Feelings)

1993 Plume Edition (published only)
Very Opening
Marvin's Giddy Seizures
A Helluva Day
I Have A Family
How Marvin Eats His Breakfast
My High School Sweetheart
Set Those Sails
My Chance to Survive the Night
High-Heeled Ladies at Five O'Clock (A Calypso Fantasy)
The Rape of Miss Goldberg by Marvin (A Fantasy Which Is Better Abstracted)
I Am Wearing a Hat
Wedding Song (Part One)
Three Seconds
Wedding Song (Part Two)

I Feel Him Slipping Away
Whizzer Going Down
A Breakfast Over Sugar
The Nausea Before the Game
Love Me for What I Am
How America Got Its Name
Been A Helluva Day (Reprise)
Marvin Takes a Victory Shower
Another Sleepless Night (Reprise)
In Trousers

Recording
The original cast album is available on CD on the Original Cast Records label. In reviewing the Original Cast recording, William Ruhlmann wrote: "Since Finn turned out to be the most impressive songwriting talent to emerge in the musical theater in the 1980s, this record, a cast recording of the 1979 production, is of more than passing interest, even if, in comparison to its successors, it is slight. Still, the music is lively and melodic, the lyrics often provocative and surprising, and the performances, notably that of Chip Zien, who appeared in the later shows in a different role, arresting. The album made some changes for time. For example, it cut the opening number, Very Opening, and abbreviated several songs, most noticeably The Rape of Miss Goldberg. The number How America Got Its Name was cut, except for Marvin's final words.

References

External links
First 1979 production at Internet Off-Broadway Database
Second 1979 production at Internet Off-Broadway Database
1981 Production at Internet Off-Broadway Database
1985 production at Internet Off-Broadway Database

1979 musicals
Off-Broadway musicals
Original musicals
LGBT-related musicals
Sung-through musicals
Musicals by William Finn
Plays set in New York City
One-act musicals